Remigio Cantagallina (c. 1582–1656) was an Italian etcher active in the Baroque period.

He was born in Sansepolcro, formerly Borgo Santo Sepolcro, in the province of Arezzo. He is best known for his etchings of landscapes and religious subjects, influenced by Paul Bril. He was likely a pupil of the fellow-Florentine Giulio Parigi and Jacopo Ligozzi. In 1612–13 he traveled through the Dutch Republic, the Southern Netherlands, and France, which he documented in detailed drawings in pen and wash of buildings, houses, and cityscapes, complete with persons engaged at work or play in the foreground. His eye caught both the courtly celebrations and the peasant world. He produced detailed views of Brussels and Siena. Jacques Callot was reputed to be a pupil of Cantagallina, before the former moved to Rome to work with Antonio Tempesta. He also likely tutored Stefano della Bella. After 1648, he tutored in drawing the scientist and nature observer Francesco Redi. The engraver Niccolo Angeli was also his pupil.

He painted a Last Supper (1604) for the church of San Bartolomeo (now in Museo Civico) of Sansepolcro; aiding him in this painting was a relative, said to be a brother, Antonio Cantagallina (b. 1616), who distinguished himself as architect in his hometown and Livorno. Another relative, Gianfrancesco (Giovanni Francesco), was also an architect. He died at Florence.

Among his plates are landscapes, theatrical decorations, and triumphal entries: two landscapes; one with a bridge, the other with buildings; both dated 1603; Immaculate Conception after Callot; A set of four landscapes (1609); A further set of six landscapes; A set of twelve landscapes and an octagon marked with his initials; a set of six landscapes with his cipher (1624); A set of plates of the Scenes of an Opera after Giulio Parigi; and a set of plates, called the Palazzo della Fame(1608).

References

 Artnet biography from Grove encyclopedia or Art.
 Short Bibliography

1582 births
1656 deaths
People from Sansepolcro
16th-century Italian painters
Italian male painters
17th-century Italian painters
Italian etchers
Painters from Tuscany
Italian Baroque painters